BPA Worldwide is a United States-based company that provides independent, third-party audits of audience claims of business-to-business and consumer media and events. Its membership includes magaziness, newspapers, web sites, events, email newsletters, digital magazines and other advertiser-supported media produced by its members. The company is a not-for-profit, (501(c)(6) organization, and is one of the largest auditor of media in the world in terms of membership, which consists of media owners, marketer companies and advertising agencies. In addition to its U.S. headquarters, BPA operates offices in Canada, the UK, and China. 

BPA’s services have expanded with the launch of its BPA iCompli brand, which assists in the creation of standards for government and industry bodies and provides external assurance of these standards.

History

20th century
In 1931, Controlled Circulation Audit Inc (CCA) opened in New York City. Their first audit, Drug Topics, was completed in September of that year.

In 1954, the CCA changed its name to BPA, which at the time stood for Business Publications Audit of Circulation, Inc. In the same year that they opened their first satellite office in Chicago, Illinois. In 1970 BPA completed its first audit of a European title, Vision.

In 1980, the first audit of pass-along individuals was conducted for Architectural Record. This report used surveys to qualified subscribers to determine how many additional individuals also read their copy of the publication.

In 1985, BPA opened their West Coast office in Los Angeles.

In 1995, BPA was changed to BPA International with the addition of their first overseas office in London. In 1998, the Canadian Circulations Audit Board (CCAB) merged with BPA International. With the addition of their audited titles, total media owner membership exceeded 2,500 members and 500 employees.

21st century
In 2004, BPA International changed its name to BPA Worldwide. This coincided with the opening of an office in Beijing, China. In 2006, BPA opened an office in Dubai Media City.

BPA launched its Brand Report product in 2008. The statement reports all of a media owner's audience "touch points" on a single statement.

In 2012, BPA opened a branch office in Shenzhen, China. BPA opened another office in Hong Kong in March 2001. 

BPA Worldwide currently performs nearly 2,600 audits engagements in more than 15 countries.

The BPA Media Exchange was launched in 2017 to help publishers deploy media solutions in an evolving digital marketplace. Publishers and advertisers may transact through the Media Exchange via both direct- and indirect sales activation.

In July 2022, Richard Murphy was named President and Chief Executive Officer of BPA Worldwide. Murphy replaced Glenn Hansen, who has announced his intent to retire in June 2023. In the interim, Hansen was named Executive Strategic Advisor to focus on BPA iCompli Sustainability and Event Audit practices.

References

External links
Official website

Accounting firms of the United States
Auditing in the United States
Consumer magazines
Publishing organizations